Macrophthalmus setosus is a species of sentinel crab found on the east coast of Australia, from around Queensland to Sydney. Macrophthalmus setosus is found low down on muddy river and creek banks and in exposed sea grass areas in tidal zones, at times near mangroves. Males have a tooth on the upper claw (dactyl). The carapace is around 40 mm wide, and rectangular, greater than 1.7 times wide than long. Eye stalks are long and thin.

References 

Crustaceans of the Pacific Ocean
Ocypodoidea
Crustaceans described in 1852